Little River High School is a historic school located on Route 501 southwest of Bahama in Durham County, North Carolina .Built in 1939, it is listed on the National Register of Historic Places.

History 
The school was constructed in 1939 to serve the African Americans students in rural northern Durham County.

References

High schools in North Carolina
African-American history in Durham, North Carolina
School buildings on the National Register of Historic Places in North Carolina
Neoclassical architecture in North Carolina
Modern Movement architecture in the United States
School buildings completed in 1939
Buildings and structures in Durham, North Carolina
National Register of Historic Places in Durham County, North Carolina
1939 establishments in North Carolina